Christopher W. Murray (born 1953) was the United States Ambassador to the Republic of the Congo from 2010 until 2013.

Murray graduated from Lawrence University in 1975.

References

1953 births
Ambassadors of the United States to the Republic of the Congo
Lawrence University alumni
Living people